"Crying for No Reason" is a song by English singer Katy B, produced by Geeneus. It was released on 26 January 2014 as the second single from her second studio album, Little Red. It entered the UK Singles Chart at number five.

Music video
The music video for the song was released onto Katy B's YouTube channel on 26 December 2013, lasting a total length of four minutes and three seconds. As of April 2019, the video has over 12 million views.

Critical reception
Robert Copsey of Digital Spy gave the song a positive review, stating:

Now in the January/February Q1 period where exciting releases are few and far between, her latest effort 'Crying For No Reason' shines brightly in an otherwise desolate pop landscape. That's not to say the song itself - a stunning breakstep ballad about having a weepy moment for no particular reason ("I felt strong but am I breaking now?" she asks over crashing electro drums) - isn't worthy of such attention, as it really is one of the best ballads we've heard in quite some time. .

Track listing

Personnel
 Kathleen "Katy B" Brien - vocals, writer
 Gordon "Geeneus" Warren - producer, instruments, writer
 Guy Chambers - writer

Chart performance

The song charted at number 5 in the United Kingdom and also peaked at 21 in the Irish Charts. It is her first solo single to chart in Ireland.

Charts and certifications

Weekly charts

Year-end charts

Certifications

References

Katy B songs
2014 singles
2010s ballads
Pop ballads
Synth-pop ballads
Songs written by Guy Chambers
Columbia Records singles
Music videos directed by Sophie Muller
2014 songs